Tumeltsham is a municipality in the district of Ried im Innkreis in the Austrian state of Upper Austria.

Geography
Tumeltsham lies in the Innviertel. About 9 percent of the municipality is forest, and 74 percent is farmland.

References

Cities and towns in Ried im Innkreis District